Athanaric's Wall, also called Lower Trajan's Wall or Southern Trajan's Wall, was a fortification line probably erected by Athanaric (the king of the Thervingi), between the banks of river Gerasius (modern Prut) and the Danube to the land of Taifali (modern Oltenia). Most probably, Athanaric's Wall has reused the old Roman limes called Limes Transalutanus.

Structure

Historian Theodore Mommsen wrote that Romans built a defensive wall from the Danube delta to Tyras. He wrote:
   

 
	
The structure is made of earthen walls and palisades, with an elevation of only three meters (which is mostly eroded away).

It stretches from Romania Buciumeni-Tiganesti-Tapu to Stoicani and after that it enters Moldova. In southern Moldova, it stretches another 126 km from the village of Vadul lui Isac in the Cahul District by the Prut River, and then goes into Ukraine ending at Lake Sasyk by Tatarbunar.

Some historians think that the southern Trajan Wall reached the city of Tyras, when was annexed by emperor Nero. Indeed, a Roman bronze coin was found during excavations that discovered evidences of the original construction in the first century

In the 19th century the coat of arms of the Cahul uyezd of Bessarabia, Russian Empire, incorporated the image of "Trajan's Wall".

Historical debate

Some academics such as Dorel Bondoc think that the wall was built by the Romans, because it required a great deal of knowledge and a workforce that barbarians like Athanaric did not have.

Bondoc wrote that "[The Wall's] huge size means the need of considerable material and human resources, a condition that could be met only by the Roman Empire ... the period of time when it was built stretched from Constantine the Great to Valentinian I and Valens".

Some scholars, like Vasile Nedelciuc, argue that the turf Wall was built initially by the Romans during Nero rule from the Prut river to Tyras, even because it has a ditch facing north. He argues that later it was enlarged by Athanaric, but only until Sasyk lagoon.

See also 
 Upper Trajan's Wall
 Trajan's Wall
 Limes Moesiae
 Limes Romanus
 Limes Transalutanus
 Pietroasele

References

Bibliography

 Emanuel Constantin Antoche, Marcel Tanasache, (1990) Le Vallum (Troian) de la Moldavie centrale in "Etudes Roumaines et Aroumaines". Sociétés européennes, no. 8, Paris ; Bucharest : [s.n], pp. 130-133, 
 
 Rădulescu Adrian, Bitoleanu Ion. Istoria românilor dintre Dunăre și Mare: Dobrogea. Editura Științifică și Enciclopedică, București, 1979
 Heather, Peter. The Goths. The Peoples of Europe. Publisher Wiley. London, 1998 
 Mommsen, Theodore. The Provinces of the Roman Empire. Barnes & Noble Books. New York, 1996 
 Wacher, J.S. The Roman world. Routledge Publisher. New York, 2002.

External links
 Roman castra and walls from Romania/Moldovia – Google Maps / Earth
 Valurile lui Traian (in Romanian)

Roman frontiers
Roman walls in Romania
Goths
Roman Dacia
Ancient Roman buildings and structures in Romania
Moesia
Roman fortifications in Ukraine
Roman fortifications in Moldova
Roman fortifications in Romania
Linear earthworks